Reynaldo Martorell is the Robert W. Woodruff Professor of International Nutrition at Emory University. He has been on faculty at Cornell University and Stanford University. He is also a director of the International Nutrition Foundation, vice president of the Pan American Health and Education Foundation and an advisor to UNICEF, the World Food Program, the World Health Organization, and the World Bank. He has also been President of the Society for International Nutrition Research.

Martorell graduated from St. Louis University with a bachelor's degree in anthropology followed by a PhD in biological anthropology from the University of Washington.

Awards and recognition
McCollum International Lectureship
International Nutrition Prize
Health Award, Carlos Slim Foundation

References

External links
Reynaldo Martorell – Emory University

Emory University faculty
Year of birth missing (living people)
Living people
University of Washington alumni
American nutritionists
Saint Louis University alumni
Members of the National Academy of Medicine